Doris Margaret Anderson  (July 5, 1922 – October 16, 2022) was a Canadian nutritionist and politician who served as a senator.

Anderson was born at St. Peters Bay, Prince Edward Island, the daughter of William W. and Florence Anderson. She attended Prince of Wales College, Acadia University and Cornell University where she earned bachelor's and masters's degrees and was a nutritionist and educator by career. Her thesis in 1951 was entitled A History of Celiac Disease with Special Emphasis on Theories of Etiology and Treatment.

From 1948 to 1966, she was employed at Prince of Wales College in the home economics department, first as a lecturer, eventually rising to become an associate professor and department chair. She later served as a professor of home economics (1969–1980) and nutrition at the University of Prince Edward Island (1980–1988) before becoming professor emeritus in 1994. Anderson also worked with the Government of Prince Edward Island in the department of health.  In 1995, Anderson was appointed to the Senate by Jean Chrétien, representing the senatorial division of St. Peter's, Kings County, Prince Edward Island. She retired at the mandatory age of 75 in 1997. She was a member of the Liberal caucus.

In 1982, she was made a Member of the Order of Canada in recognition of having been able to "help many children suffering from celiac disease and to contribute to education and mental health in her province".

Anderson died in Kings County, Prince Edward Island, on October 16, 2022, at the age of 100.

References

5. https://saltwire.pressreader.com/article/281840057591057Obituary published in "The Guardian", 21 October 2022
https://saltwire.pressreader.com/article/281840057591057

External links
 

1922 births
2022 deaths
Acadia University alumni
Canadian centenarians
Canadian nutritionists
Canadian senators from Prince Edward Island
Cornell University alumni
Liberal Party of Canada senators
Members of the Order of Canada
People from Kings County, Prince Edward Island
Academic staff of the University of Prince Edward Island
Women centenarians
Women in Prince Edward Island politics
Women members of the Senate of Canada
Women nutritionists